Parai-tepuí Airport  is an airstrip serving the village of Parai-tepuí in the Bolívar state of Venezuela.

The "SVPX" ICAO code may not be active.

See also
Transport in Venezuela
List of airports in Venezuela

References

External links
OpenStreetMap - Parai-tepuí
OurAirports - Parai-tepuí
SkyVector - Parai-tepuí
Bing Maps - Parai-tepuí

Airports in Venezuela